Craghead is a former mining village in County Durham, England. It is located at the bottom of the valley to the south of Stanley, on the main road between Stanley and Durham, and not far from the village of Edmondsley.

The village still has some reminders of its industrial past, including a colliery brass band. Craghead United F.C., a defunct association football club, was based here.

Also in Craghead there are many public houses including the Punch Bowl. Craghead is also well known for its wind farm which sees two wind turbines on a hill known as the Craghead Windmills.

References

External links

Villages in County Durham
Stanley, County Durham